Suchitra is an Indian singer and actress.

Suchitra may also refer to

People 
Suchitra Bharani, Princess of Siam 
Suchitra Bhattacharya, Indian novelist
Suchitra Chandrabose, Indian Telugu choreographer
Suchitra Krishnamoorthi, Indian actress, writer, painter and singer
Suchitra Mitra,  Indian singer, composer, and artist exponent
Suchitra Murali, Indian film actress
Suchitra Naik, Indian politician
Suchitra Pillai, Indian actress, singer, model, anchor and VJ
Suchitra Sebastian, Condensed matter physicist
 Suchitra Sen, Indian Bengali actress
 Suchitra Singh, Indian cricketer

Others 

Suchitra Center, Cross roads in Telangana, India